The Martin JRM Mars is a large, four-engined cargo transport flying boat designed and built by the Martin Company for the United States Navy during World War II. It was the largest Allied flying boat to enter production, although only seven were built. The United States Navy contracted the development of the XPB2M-1 Mars in 1938 as a long-range ocean patrol flying boat, which later entered production as the JRM Mars long-range transport.

Four of the surviving aircraft were later converted for civilian use to firefighting water bombers. Two of the aircraft still remain based at Sproat Lake just outside of Port Alberni, British Columbia, although neither is operational.

Design and development

The Glenn L. Martin Company scaled up their PBM Mariner patrol bomber design to produce the prototype XPB2M-1 Mars. The XPB2M-1 was announced on 8 November 1941. Delayed by an engine fire during ground runs, the aircraft first flew on 23 June 1942. After flight tests with the XPB2M between 1942 and 1943, she was passed on to the Navy. The original patrol bomber concept was considered obsolete by this time, and the Mars was converted into a transport aircraft designated the XPB2M-1R. The Navy was satisfied with the performance and ordered 20 of the modified JRM-1 Mars. The first, named Hawaii Mars, was delivered in June 1945, but with the end of World War II the Navy scaled back their order, buying only the five aircraft which were then on the production line. Though the original Hawaii Mars was lost in an accident on the Chesapeake Bay a few weeks after it first flew, the other five Mars were completed, and the last delivered in 1947.

Operational history

U.S. Navy service

Named the Marianas Mars, Philippine Mars, Marshall Mars, Caroline Mars, and a second Hawaii Mars, the five production Mars aircraft entered service ferrying cargo to Hawaii and the Pacific Islands on 23 January 1944. The last production airplane (the Caroline Mars) was designated JRM-2, powered by  Pratt & Whitney R-4360 engines, and featured a higher maximum weight and other improvements. On 4 March 1949, the Caroline Mars set a new world passenger load record by carrying 269 people from San Diego to San Francisco, CA. On 5 April 1950, the Marshall Mars was lost near Hawaii when an engine fire consumed the airplane after her crew had evacuated. The remaining "Big Four" flew record amounts of Naval cargo on the San Francisco-Honolulu route efficiently until 1956, when they were beached at NAS Alameda.

Civilian use

In 1959, the remaining Mars aircraft were to be sold for scrap, but a Canadian company, Forest Industries Flying Tankers (FIFT), was formed and bid for the four aircraft and a large spares inventory. The company represented a consortium of British Columbia forest companies, and the bid was accepted and the sale completed in December 1959. The four aircraft were flown to Fairey Aviation at Victoria, British Columbia, for conversion into water bombers. The conversion involved the installation of a  plywood tank in the cargo bay with retractable pick-up scoops to allow uploading of water while the aircraft was taxiing. The scoops allowed 30 tons of water to be taken on board in 22 seconds. Later some of the hull fuel tanks were replaced with water tanks.

The Marianas Mars crashed near Northwest Bay, British Columbia, on 23 June 1961 during firefighting operations; all four crew members were lost. Just over a year later, on 12 October 1962 while parked onshore at the Victoria airport, the Caroline Mars was damaged beyond repair by Typhoon Freda when she was blown 200 yards, breaking her back. The Hawaii Mars and Philippine Mars had their conversion into water bombers advanced and entered service in 1963. They appeared at local airshows, demonstrating their water-dropping ability. Flying Tankers Inc. flew the water bombers to hot spots around the province when a need developed, such as in August 2003, when a large forest fire threatened the outskirts of Kelowna, British Columbia.

On 10 November 2006, TimberWest Forest Ltd. announced they were looking for buyers of the Mars. A condition of sale was that the purchaser would have to donate one plane back to Port Alberni when they were retired, as a historic attraction. The Glenn L Martin Maryland Aviation Museum and British Columbia Aviation Council initiated a joint effort to preserve the aircraft, one for display in Maryland and the other at the current location in Canada. On 13 April 2007, TimberWest announced the sale of both aircraft to Coulson Forest Products, a local forestry company in Port Alberni, British Columbia. The two surviving tankers are presently operated by Coulson Flying Tankers and are based and maintained at Sproat Lake near Port Alberni. On 25 October 2007, the Hawaii Mars ("Redtail") arrived at Lake Elsinore in southern California, on a private contract, to assist with firefighting efforts at the California wildfires of October 2007. Meanwhile, the Philippine Mars had been undergoing "extensive maintenance and renovation" and was expected to be ready to fly again by 2010. , the Hawaii Mars was in service fighting the La Brea fire east of Santa Maria in Southern California.

The aircraft can carry 7,200 U.S. gallons (27,276 litres) of water and each deployment can cover an area of up to 4 acres (1.6 hectares). The aircraft can also carry up to 600 U.S. gallons (2,270 litres) of foam concentrate for gelling the load drop. They are mainly used to fight fires along the coast of British Columbia and sometimes in the interior. As of July 29, 2010, the Martin Mars was being used to fight the Mason Lake/Bonaparte Lake fire north of Kamloops.

On 23 August 2012, the Coulson Group announced that the Philippine Mars, due to its lack of use for five years, would be retired and flown to the National Naval Aviation Museum at Naval Air Station Pensacola, Florida to become a static exhibit. The aircraft was repainted to its original U.S. Navy colors and was to have been delivered to the museum in November 2012.  After many delays, the trade deal of transferring the aircraft to the museum was put on hold by the Navy in June 2016, pending the outcome of the 2016 US Presidential election.

On 10 May 2013, the B.C. provincial government announced that the Hawaii Mars would no longer be placed on contract after the 2013 season, due to not having been used to fight any B.C. fires for two years and the operation of newer and more versatile aircraft by the Coulson group including a Lockheed C-130 Hercules converted to firefighting use. Although Coulson has stated that the Hawaii Mars has been under numerous recent upgrades to make it safer and more reliable, no buyers have come forward to purchase the aircraft. Coulson also cautioned against any plans to open the aircraft as a tourist attraction, citing the 2013 closure of the Flying Tankers Bomber Base Museum from poor attendance.

In May 2015, the Hawaii Mars received a small contract to be used briefly for training Chinese pilots. This was done using the Martin Mars to evaluate against civil certification regulations by the International Test Pilots School on how to handle such a large amphibious aircraft. The pilots would be involved with the Chinese state-owned Aviation Industry Corporation of China as they get ready to launch their forthcoming AVIC TA-600 airplane.  Subsequently, in July 2015, the airplane was put back in service after public outcry, being awarded a 30-day contract from the BC Government to help with a particularly bad fire season.

In 2016, the Hawaii Mars made its first appearance at EAA AirVenture Oshkosh in hopes of being sold or leased to a new home or business. One of the pilots on the way to Oshkosh was well-known Kermit Weeks.

In January 2022, the "Hawaii Mars" was the subject of multiple news articles when it was placed on sale by the company Platinum Fighter Sales for over $5 million.

Variants
XPB2M-1
Model 170 prototype long-range patrol flying boat powered by four Wright R-3350-8 piston engines, one built, converted to XPB2M-1R.
XPB2M-1R
Prototype converted in December 1943 as a prototype transport version, armament removed, installation of additional cargo hatches and cargo loading equipment, existing hatches were enlarged and the decking was reinforced.
JRM-1
Model 170A, production long range transport variant, originally 20 aircraft ordered later reduced to six. Single-tail design, and having a longer hull with fewer bulkheads and a larger maximum take-off weight. It had also been fitted with equipment for overhead cargo handling and was powered by four Wright R-3350-24WA Cyclone engines with 4-bladed propellers, five built, surviving four converted to JRM-3.
JRM-2
The last JRM-1 on order was completed as the JRM-2 with the engines changed to 3,000 hp Pratt & Whitney R4360-4T engines with 4-blade, 16 ft, 8 in diameter Curtiss Electric propellers. Gross weight increased by 20,000 lb.
JRM-3
Model 170B, conversion of the remaining four JRM-1s re-engined with 2,400 hp Wright R3350-24WA engines turning 16 ft, 8 in Curtiss-Electric props, of which the inboard two engines were fitted with reversible-pitch devices.

Aircraft

The Old Lady – Bureau Number (BuNo) 1520. Ordered on 23 August 1938 and completed as the prototype long-range patrol XPB2M-1, it was first flown on 3 July 1942 and converted in December 1943 to transport variant and designated XPB2M-1R. Assigned initially to VR-8 at NAS Patuxent River, Maryland for crew training, it was later transferred to VR-2 at NAS Alameda, California and scrapped in 1945.
Hawaii Mars I – JRM-1 BuNo 76819 first flown on 21 July 1945 and delivered to the United States Navy. It sank on 5 August 1945 in the Chesapeake Bay and was disposed as scrap.
Philippine Mars – JRM-1 BuNo 76820, delivered to the USN on 26 June 1946 and assigned to VR-2 at NAS Alameda, California. Converted and re-designated JRM-3. Withdrawn from service on 22 August 1956 and sold in 1959, it was converted to forest fire fighting aircraft and registered CF-LYK (later C-FLYK). The aircraft continued to fly with Flying Tankers Incorporated until she and the Hawaii Mars were purchased in 2007 by the Coulson Group. The Philippine Mars has not flown on fires since the summer of 2006 and was repainted to original U.S. Navy markings in preparation for transfer to be a museum display at the National Naval Aviation Museum at NAS Pensacola, Florida. The plan to ferry her to the museum in April or May 2016 was put on hold. As of September 2020, the Philippine Mars remains stored at the Sproat Lake base alongside the Hawaii Mars.
Marianas Mars – JRM-1 BuNo 76821, delivered to the USN on 26 February 1946 and assigned to VR-2 at NAS Alameda. Converted and re-designated JRM-3, it was withdrawn from service on 22 August 1956 and sold in 1959. Converted to forest fire fighting aircraft and registered CF-LYJ, the aircraft crashed into Mount Moriarty near Nanaimo, Vancouver Island, on 23 June 1961, when the water drop mechanism failed, leaving the aircraft unable to climb quickly enough to clear a mountain. In the ensuing crash, the crew of four were killed.
Marshall Mars - JRM-1 BuNo 76822, delivered to the USN, converted and re-designated JRM-3. It was destroyed by an engine fire and sank on 5 April 1950 off Diamond Head, Oahu, Hawaii.
Hawaii Mars II – JRM-1 BuNo 76823, delivered to the USN on 23 April 1946 and assigned to VR-2 at NAS Alameda. Converted and redesignated JRM-3, it was withdrawn from service on 22 August 1956 and sold in 1959. Converted to forest fire fighting aircraft and registered CF-LYL (later C-FLYL), it remains the only aircraft of this type in service and flew with FIFT (Forest Industries Flying Tankers), FTI (Flying Tankers Inc.) and the Coulson Group at Sproat Lake, British Columbia, Canada until 2013 and briefly in 2015.  According to aircraft fleet information provided by the Coulson Aviation website, "Coulson Aviation has significantly upgraded the Hawaii, bringing it to the higher aviation and safety standards of modern-day firefighting.  The next-generation Hawaii Mars has an EFIS glass cockpit and the ability to stream live data from certain key on-board indication systems.  Other data now available from the aircraft include real time flight tracking, load data measuring, aircraft performance statistics, atmospheric condition at drop readings, and accurate drop location reporting." The aircraft also is equipped with a satellite phone and cockpit voice recorder, Coulson Group Vice President Britt Coulson told CNN's Thom Patterson during a tour of the flight deck in 2016.
Caroline Mars – JRM-2 BuNo 76824, delivered to the USN on 10 May 1948 and assigned to VR-2 at NAS Alameda. It was sold in 1959 and converted to forest fire fighting aircraft by Forest Industry Flying Tankers. Registered CF-LYM. the aircraft was damaged beyond repair during Typhoon Freda at Victoria, Canada on 12 October 1962.

Specifications (JRM-3 Mars)

 Drop speed: 
 Landing approach speed: 
 Touchdown speed: 
 Operations duration (normal):  hours
 Area covered, single drop: 
 Drop height: 
 Full water tank load:

See also

References

Notes

Bibliography
Bridgman, Leonard. “The Martin Model 170 Mars.” Jane's Fighting Aircraft of World War II. London: Studio, 1946. .
Coulson, Wayne and Steve Ginter. The Mighty Martin Mars: From 1945 US Navy Transport to 21st Century, Initial Attack Firefighting. Port Alberni, British Columbia, Canada: Half Moon Bay Publications, 2009. 
Ginter, Steve. Martin Mars XPB2M-1R & JRM Flying Boats (Naval Fighters 29). Simi Valley, California, USA: Ginter Books, 1995. .

External links

Martin Mars - Speedvision Documentary
"The Mars Makes Good", Popular Science, April 1944 article
"Life Line Of The Fleet," Popular Mechanics, June 1944, pp. 69,70 photos
Flying Tankers, Inc. 
Martin Mars Page of the Glenn L. Martin Maryland Aviation Museum
Museum-Canadian Mars Alliance Created
Martin Mars - Airtanker Supreme
Martin Mars - Detailed production list of all seven aircraft built
"Memo To: Overocean Airlines RE: the Martin Mars", a 1945 Flight advertisement for the Mars
Life photos by George Strock of the prototype Mars rollout 1941; Marauders in background
Martin Mars photos old and recent on the Nanaimo site
Saluting the Martin Mars - History 1946 to 2014 

1940s United States military transport aircraft
Flying boats
JR1M
Four-engined tractor aircraft
High-wing aircraft
Aerial firefighting aircraft
Aircraft first flown in 1942
Four-engined piston aircraft